The EP Collectibles is a compilation of tracks that had previously appeared on Missy Higgins’s EPs and singles between 2003-2009.The album was released worldwide, digitally in August 2010

Track listing
 "Greed for Your Love" (Live) - 4:03
 "Scar" (Live) - 3:19
 'The Special Two" (Live) - 4:50
 "Falling" - 4:18
 "Greed for Your Love" - 4:07
 "Ten Days" (Live) - 3:41
 "This Is How It Goes" (Live) - 3:57
 "The Battle" - 2:15
 "Casualty" - 4:11
 "Dancing Dirt Into the Snow" - 3:26
 "The Cactus That Found the Beat" - 2:02
 "Hold Me Tight" - 3:48
 "Blind Winter" - 3:19
 "Drop the Mirror" - 4:34
 "You Just Like Me 'Cause I'm Good in Bed" - 2:44
 "Don't Ever" (Live) - 2:51
 "Dusty Road" - 3:11
 "Stuff and Nonsense" - 3:29
 "In Love Again" - 4:20
 "Steer" (Triple J Acoustic Version) - 3:48
 "Where I Stood" (Live from Cities) - 4:21
 "Warm Whispers" (XM Session) - 5:06
 "Forgive Me" (XM Session) - 4:12
 "Peachy" (XM Session) - 2:36
 "Secret" (XM Session) - 4:19
 "Steer" (XM Session) - 3:54
 "Breakdown" (Live with Brett Dennen & Mason Jennings) - 3:05
 "More Than This" - 3:00
 "100 Round the Bends" - 2:58
 "All for Believing" (Live) - 2:52
 "The Wrong Girl" (Live) - 3:29
 "Angela (Live) - 3:17
 "Sugarcane" (Live) - 3:35
 "Going North" (Live) - 3:12

References

2010 compilation albums
Missy Higgins albums
Eleven: A Music Company albums